Information paradox is the short form for two paradoxes:

 Arrow information paradox
 Black hole information paradox